Francisco de Moura Corte Real, 3rd Marquis of Castelo Rodrigo (13 December 1621 – 26 November 1675) was a Portuguese nobleman who served as Viceroy of Spanish Sardinia and Governor of the Spanish Netherlands.

Life
Francisco de Moura was the son of the Portuguese nobleman, Manuel de Moura, 2nd Marquis of Castelo Rodrigo, who had been Governor of the Habsburg Netherlands between 1644 and 1647, and of Leonor de Melo. A member of the Corte-Real family, he was a Gentleman of the Chamber of King Philip III of Portugal, later member of his council of state and his ambassador to Vienna in 1651.

He was named Duke of Nochera on 10 August 1656, and served as Viceroy of Sardinia between 1657 and 1661, and Governor of the Habsburg Netherlands between 1664 and 1668. Under his administration, the Spanish Netherlands suffered a French invasion during the War of Devolution. By this time, Spain was so weak that it could put up very little resistance to the French assault. The French even spoke of "une promenade militaire." Moura was later appointed as Caballerizo mayor to the King and died in Madrid in December 1675.

Sources

External links

1610 births
1675 deaths
Viceroys of Sardinia
Governors of the Habsburg Netherlands
Francisco 03
Portuguese nobility
Knights of the Military Order of Christ
Portuguese diplomats
17th-century Portuguese people